The 2019 National Junior A Championship was the 49th Canadian junior A ice hockey national championship for the Canadian Junior Hockey League and the 49th consecutive year a national championship was awarded to this skill level since the breakaway of Major Junior hockey in 1970.  The tournament was played at the Centennial Regional Arena in Brooks, Alberta from May 11 to 19, 2019.  The event and championship trophy were without a sponsor or title for this year following the ending of Royal Bank of Canada's partnership with Hockey Canada; Hockey Canada formally reinstated the Centennial Cup as the Junior 'A' championship in the summer of 2019.

Teams
Brooks Bandits (Host)
Prince George Spruce Kings (Pacific)
Portage Terriers (Western)
Oakville Blades (Central)
Ottawa Jr. Senators (Eastern)

Tournament

Round-robin

Round-robin schedule

Finals

Awards
Roland Mercier Trophy (Tournament MVP): Francis Boisvert, Ottawa Jr. Senators
Top Forward: Ryan Mahshie, Brooks Bandits
Top Defencemen: Luke Bast, Brooks Bandits
Top Goaltender: Logan Neaton, Prince George Spruce Kings
Tubby Schmalz Trophy (Sportsmanship): Simon Gravel, Brooks Bandits
Top Scorer: Spencer Kersten, Oakville Blades

References

External links
2019 National Junior A Championship

Royal Bank Cup
Canadian Junior Hockey League national championships
Royal Bank Cup 2019
Brooks, Alberta